"Go Down Moses" is a well known African American spiritual that describes the Hebrew exodus, specifically drawing from Exodus 5:1: "And the LORD spoke unto Moses, Go unto Pharaoh, and say unto him, Thus saith the LORD, Let my people go, that they may serve me", where God commands Moses to demand the release of the Israelites from bondage in Egypt. As is common in spirituals, the song discusses freedom, referring both to the freedom of the Israelites, and that of runaway enslaved people. As a result of these messages, this song was outlawed by many enslavers. 

The opening verse as published by the Jubilee Singers in 1872:

Lyrically, the song discusses the liberation of the ancient Jewish people from Egyptian slavery. This story held a second meaning for enslaved African Americans, as they related their experiences under slavery to those of Moses and the Israelites who were enslaved by the pharaoh, and they resonated with the message that God will come to the aid of the persecuted. "Go Down Moses" also makes references to the Jordan River, commonly associated with reaching freedom in spirituals because such an act of running away often involved crossing one or more rivers.
Since the Old Testament recognizes the Nile Valley as further south, and thus, lower than Jerusalem and the Promised Land, heading to Egypt means going "down" while going away from Egypt is "up". In the context of American slavery, this ancient sense of "down" converged with the concept of "down the river" (the Mississippi), where enslaved people's conditions were notoriously worse. Later verses also draw parallels between the Israelites' freedom from slavery and humanity's freedom won by Christ.

"Oh! Let My People Go"

Although usually thought of as a spiritual, the earliest written record of the song was as a rallying anthem for the Contrabands at Fort Monroe sometime before July 1862. White people who reported on the song presumed it was composed by them. This became the first spiritual to be recorded in sheet music that is known of, by Reverend Lewis Lockwood. While visiting Fortress Monroe in 1861, he heard runaway enslaved people singing this song, transcribed what he heard, and eventually published it in the National Anti-Slavery Standard. Sheet music was soon after published titled "Oh! Let My People Go: The Song of the Contrabands", arranged by Horace Waters. L.C. Lockwood, chaplain of the Contrabands, stated in the sheet music that the song was from Virginia, dating from about 1853. However, the song was not included in Slave Songs of the United States, despite its being a very prominent spiritual among enslaved people. Furthermore, the original version of the song sung by enslaved people almost definitely sounded very different from what Lockwood transcribed by ear, especially following an arrangement by a person who had never before heard the song as it was originally sung. The opening verse, as recorded by Lockwood, is:

Sarah Bradford's authorized biography of Harriet Tubman, Scenes in the Life of Harriet Tubman (1869), quotes Tubman as saying she used "Go Down Moses" as one of two code songs used with fugitive enslaved people to communicate when fleeing Maryland. Tubman began her underground railroad work in 1850 and continued until the beginning of the Civil War, so it's possible Tubman's use of the song predates the origin claimed by Lockwood. Some people even hypothesize that she herself may have written the spiritual.  Others claim that Nat Turner, who led one of the most well-known slave revolts in history, either wrote or was the inspiration for the song.

In popular culture

Films
 Al Jolson sings it in Alan Crosland' film Big Boy (1930).
 Used briefly in Kid Millions (1934).
Uncredited
Sung by marching negro soldiers off to fight the Yankees in film Gone with the Wind  (1939).

 Jess Lee Brooks sings it in Preston Sturges' film Sullivan's Travels (1941).
 Gregory Miller (played by Sidney Poitier) sang the song in the film Blackboard Jungle (1955).
 A reference is made to the song in the film Ferris Bueller's Day Off (1986), when a bedridden Cameron Frye sings, "When Cameron was in Egypt's land, let my Cameron go".
 Sergei Bodrov Jr. and Oleg Menshikov, who play the two main characters in Sergei Bodrov's film Кавказский пленник (1996; Prisoner of the Mountains) dance to the Louis Armstrong version.
 The teen comedy film Easy A (2010) remixed this song with a fast guitar and beats. The song was originally published as Original Soundtrack and is listed in IMDb.

Literature
 William Faulkner titled his 1942 short-story collection Go Down, Moses after the song.
 Djuna Barnes, in her 1936 novel Nightwood, titled a chapter "Go Down, Matthew" as an allusion to the song's title.
 In Margaret Mitchell's 1936 novel Gone with the Wind, enslaved people from the Georgia plantation Tara are in Atlanta, to dig breastworks for the soldiers, and they sing "Go Down, Moses" as they march down a street.

Music
 The song was made famous by Paul Robeson whose deep voice was said by Robert O'Meally to have assumed "the might and authority of God."
 On February 7, 1958, the song was recorded in New York City and sung by Louis Armstrong with Sy Oliver's Orchestra.
 It was recorded by Doris Akers and the Sky Pilot Choir.
 The song has since become a jazz standard, having been recorded by Grant Green, Fats Waller, Archie Shepp, Hampton Hawes and many others.
 It is one of the five spirituals included in the oratorio A Child of Our Time, first performed in 1944, by the English classical composer Michael Tippett (190598).
 It is included in some seders in the United States, and is printed in Meyer Levin's An Israel Haggadah for Passover. 
 The song was recorded by Deep River Boys in Oslo on September 26, 1960. It was released on the extended play Negro Spirituals No. 3 (HMV 7EGN 39).
 The song, or a modified version of it, has been used in the Roger Jones musical From Pharaoh to Freedom
 The French singer Claude Nougaro used its melody for his tribute to Louis Armstrong in French, under the name Armstrong (1965).
 "Go Down Moses" has sometimes been called "Let My People Go" and performed by a variety of musical artists, including RebbeSoul
 The song heavily influences "Get Down Moses", by Joe Strummer & the Mescaleros on their album Streetcore (2003).
 The song has been performed by the Russian Interior Ministry (MVD) Choir.
 Jazz singer Tony Vittia released a swing version under the name "Own The Night" (2013).
 The phrase "Go Down Moses" is featured in the chorus of the John Craigie song, "Will Not Fight" (2009).
 The phrase "Go Down Moses" is sung by Pops Staples with the Staple Singers in the song "The Weight" in The Last Waltz film by The Band (1976). The usual lyric is actually "Go down Miss Moses".
 Avant-garde singer-songwriter and composer Diamanda Galás recorded a version for her fifth album, You Must Be Certain of the Devil (1988), the final part of a trilogy about the AIDS epidemic that features songs influenced by American gospel music and biblical themes, and later in Plague Mass (1991) and The Singer (1992).
 Composer Nathaniel Dett used the text and melody of "Go Down Moses"  throughout his oratorio, "The Ordering of Moses" (1937). In the first section, Dett sets the melody with added-note harmonies, quartal chords, modal harmonies, and chromaticism (especially French augmented sixth chords). Later in the oratorio, "Go Down Moses" is set as a fugue.

Television
 The NBC television comedy The Fresh Prince of Bel-Air twice used the song for comedic effect. In the first instance, Will Smith's character sings the song after he and his cousin Carlton Banks are thrown into prison (Smith sings the first two lines, Banks sullenly provides the refrain, then a prisoner sings the final four lines in an operatic voice.) In the second instance, Banks is preparing for an Easter service and attempts to show off his prowess by singing the last two lines of the chorus; Smith replies with his own version, in which he makes a joke about Carlton's height ("...Let my cousin grow!").
In Dr. Katz, Professional Therapist is sung by Katz and Ben during the end credits of the episode "Thanksgiving" (Season 5, Episode 18).
 Della Reese sings it in Episode 424, "Elijah", of Touched by an Angel, which Bruce Davison sings "Eliyahu".
 In series 2 episode 3 of Life on Mars, the lawyer sings for his client's release.
 The song was an answer on an episode of Jeopardy

Recordings
The Tuskegee Institute Singers recorded the song for Victor in 1914.
 The Kelly Family recorded the song twice: live version is included on their album Live (1988) and a studio version on New World (1990). The latter also features on their compilation album The Very Best - Over 10 Years (1993).
 The Golden Gate Quartet (Duration: 3:05; recorded in 1957 for their album Spirituals).
 "Go Down Moses" was recorded by the Robert Shaw Chorale on RCA Victor 33 record LM/LSC 2580, copyright 1964, first side, second band, lasting 4 minutes and 22 seconds. Liner notes by noted African-American author Langston Hughes.

See also 
Christian child's prayer § Spirituals
Let My People Go (disambiguation)

References

Bibliography
The Continental Monthly. Vol. II (July–December 1862). New York.
Lockwood, L.C. "Oh! Let My People Go: The Song of the Contrabands". New York: Horace Waters (1862).

External links
Sweet Chariot: The Story of the Spirituals, particularly their section on "Freedom" (Web site maintained by The Spirituals Project at the University of Denver)
 

Gospel songs
Paul Robeson songs
African-American spiritual songs
Cultural depictions of Moses
Year of song unknown
Songwriter unknown
Songs about Egypt